Elginshire, in Scotland,  was a county constituency of the House of Commons of Great Britain from 1708 to 1801 and of the House of Commons of the United Kingdom from 1801 to 1832. It elected one Member of Parliament (MP) using the first-past-the-post voting system.

In 1832, it was combined with Nairnshire and was added to form Elginshire and Nairnshire, which was in turn reconstituted in 1918 as Moray and Nairn, with the incorporation of the burghs of Elgin, Nairn and Forres which had previously been part of Inverness Burghs and Elgin Burghs.

Creation
The British parliamentary constituency was created in 1708 following the Acts of Union, 1707 and replaced the former Parliament of Scotland shire constituency of Elgin & Forresshire .

Members of Parliament

References 

Politics of Moray
Historic parliamentary constituencies in Scotland (Westminster)
Constituencies of the Parliament of the United Kingdom established in 1708
Constituencies of the Parliament of the United Kingdom disestablished in 1832